Farah City Hospital is a hospital in Farah, western Afghanistan. The hospital has major significance as the regional hospital of Farah Province. The hospital has treated many people who have been affected by U.S. bombing. Officials from the hospital also have an authoritative stance in healthcare in the province and are often sent to review smaller clinics across the region. In 2010, electricity was installed in the hospital.

References

Hospitals in Afghanistan
Farah Province